Glen Rosa is a glen near Goat Fell on the Isle of Arran in the Firth of Clyde, western Scotland.

Glen Rosa can be reached from the road just outside Brodick.

Camping and climbing
There is a campsite at the foot of the glen.

Glen Rosa is convenient to reach some of the main peaks on Arran.

References

External links
Photos of the glen
RosaBurn photography Isle of Arran photos

Glens of Scotland
Landforms of North Ayrshire